Uritsky (masculine), Uritskaya (feminine), or Uritskoye (neuter) is the name of several rural localities in Russia:
Uritsky, Bryansk Oblast, a railway crossing loop in Steklyannoraditsky Selsoviet of Bryansky District of Bryansk Oblast
Uritsky, Oryol Oblast, a settlement in Sergiyevsky Selsoviet of Livensky District of Oryol Oblast
Uritsky, Ryazan Oblast, a settlement in Karl-Marksovsky Rural Okrug of Sarayevsky District of Ryazan Oblast
Uritskoye, Leningrad Oblast, a village in Pashskoye Settlement Municipal Formation of Volkhovsky District of Leningrad Oblast
Uritskoye, Lipetsk Oblast, a selo in Uritsky Selsoviet of Terbunsky District of Lipetsk Oblast
Uritskoye, Orenburg Oblast, a selo in Petrokhersonetsky Selsoviet of Grachyovsky District of Orenburg Oblast
Uritskoye, Pskov Oblast, a village in Velikoluksky District of Pskov Oblast
Uritskoye, Ryazan Oblast, a village in Ukhorsky Rural Okrug of Spassky District of Ryazan Oblast
Uritskoye, Sakha Republic, a selo in Uritsky Rural Okrug of Olyokminsky District of the Sakha Republic
Uritskoye, Saratov Oblast, a selo in Lysogorsky District of Saratov Oblast
Uritskoye, Tver Oblast, a village in Svapushchenskoye Rural Settlement of Ostashkovsky District of Tver Oblast
Uritskoye, Belozersky District, Vologda Oblast, a selo in Paninsky Selsoviet of Belozersky District of Vologda Oblast
Uritskoye, Nikolsky District, Vologda Oblast, a village in Milofanovsky Selsoviet of Nikolsky District of Vologda Oblast